In computing, a base address is an address serving as a reference point ("base") for other addresses.  Related addresses can be accessed using an addressing scheme.

Under the relative addressing scheme, to obtain an absolute address, the relevant base address is taken and an offset (aka displacement) is added to it.  Under this type of scheme, the base address is the lowest numbered address within a prescribed range, to facilitate adding related positive-valued offsets.

See also
 Index register
 Input/Output Base Address
 Rebasing

Computer memory